Martin Doležal (born 18 December 1980) is a Czech football player who currently plays for Zbrojovka Brno.

References

 Profile at fczbrno.cz
 Guardian Football

1980 births
Living people
Czech footballers
Association football goalkeepers
Czech First League players
FC Zbrojovka Brno players
1. HFK Olomouc players
Footballers from Prague